Lindquist Field is a stadium in Ogden, Utah, United States. It is primarily used for baseball and is the home field of the Ogden Raptors independent minor league baseball team of the Pioneer League.

Description
The field was completed in 1997 and has led the Pioneer League in attendance every year since it opened. It is named after former Raptors co-owner John A. Lindquist.

In 2008, the Raptors added a new spectator deck large enough for 1,200 spectators, two more concession stands, a Hardball Café, and an additional 2,000 fixed seats to the stadium. A new masonry wall was added, and the chain-link fencing was also replaced.

The field sits at the foot of the Wasatch Range and opens up to a view of the mountains. Both BaseballParks.com and DigitalBallParks.com have awarded Lindquist Field "Best View" in all of baseball.

See also

References

External links

 Official website of the Ogden Raptors

Sports venues completed in 1997
Minor league baseball venues
Baseball venues in Utah
Sports venues in Ogden, Utah
1997 establishments in Utah